"Me Gusta" is a song by Brazilian singer Anitta featuring American rapper Cardi B and Puerto Rican rapper Myke Towers, from Anitta's fifth studio album Versions of Me. It was released as the lead single from the album through Warner Records on September 18, 2020. The song's music video was filmed in Salvador, Bahia and released the same day. A remix featuring American singer 24kGoldn was released on November 20, 2020.

Background and release 
Anitta began shooting the music video for "Me Gusta" on February 13, 2020, in the Historic Center of Salvador—a city in which she had already recorded the music video for the song "Bola Rebola"—surrounded by journalists and the local population. She posted the behind-the-scenes footage on her Instagram profile.

"Me Gusta" was originally set to be released in April 2020, however, on March 27, 2020, Anitta announced she had to postpone the release of the song amid the COVID-19 pandemic. Later on, on August 19, 2020, Anitta announced she would once again postpone the release of the song because of a "great opportunity" related to its release. She was originally scheduled to perform "Me Gusta" on the American TV show The Late Late Show with James Corden on August 20, 2020, but due to the delay of "Me Gusta", she chose to perform her 2020 song "Tócame".

Anitta then confirmed "Me Gusta" would be released on September 18, 2020. A week before the song's release, Anitta made suspense on her social media and posted a photo in which she appeared along with Myke Towers and a silhouette of a then-unknown artist. The singer then clarified that the silhouette belonged to an artist that would be featured in "Me Gusta" along with Towers. Two days after teasing the secret collaboration, Anitta confirmed that Cardi B would be featured on the song. Anitta then revealed that she was thrilled to learn that the rapper agreed to participate in the song and that Cardi B was a last-minute addition.

"Me Gusta" was then released worldwide on September 18, 2020, along with its music video.

The song features on the soundtrack for EA Sports football video game,  FIFA 21.

Production
Musically, "Me Gusta" is a Latin pop and reggaeton song with some funk carioca and pagode baiano influences. Anitta and Cardi B perform in English and Spanish, while Myke Towers performs in the latter. In her verse, Cardi portrays her alter-ego "La Cardi" and references singer Shakira.

Critical reception
In GQ, Isaac Garrido called it "an ode to Brazilian rhythms and colors". He further added that Anitta's voice "merges with that of Cardi B, with whom she achieves a synergy that celebrates the Latin spirit and together they own the touches of hip-hop and rap, delivered in a melodic Spanglish", and praised Myke Towers' verse.

Accolades

Chart performance
The song debuted on the Billboard Hot 100 chart of October 3, 2020, at number 91, making Anitta the first Brazilian artist to have an entry on the chart this decade. It became Anitta's and Myke Tower's first entry on the US Billboard Hot 100.

Music video
Directed by Daniel Russel, the music video was filmed in Salvador, Bahia and premiered on September 18, 2020. It features Afro-Latinas from Salvador and people from LGBTQ communities. The video shows scenes at a carnival-like street party and a runway. In the video, Anitta wears several colorful outfits, including a rainbow dress. Cardi B wears a lavender corset and a rose-covered skirt.

Anitta commented in an interview with NBC News that she received advice from an expert on Afro-Brazilian history on how to best showcase its roots through imagery. She also stated, "I understand it's music for people to have fun... But in the video, from behind, we have a message. We are exalting all types of women and saying how much we like it when they do whatever they want to do".

Charts

Weekly charts

Monthly charts

Year-end charts

Certifications and sales

Release history

References

2020 singles
2020 songs
Anitta (singer) songs
Cardi B songs
Songs written by Anitta (singer)
Songs written by Cardi B
Songs written by Ryan Tedder
Song recordings produced by Ryan Tedder
Warner Records singles
Spanglish songs
Macaronic songs
Myke Towers songs